Aquí y Ahora may refer to:
 Aquí y Ahora (Erik Rubin album), 2009
 Aquí y Ahora (Taxi album), 2010
 Aquí y Ahora (TV series)